Hymenelia is a genus of lichen-forming fungi belonging to the family Hymeneliaceae.

Collectively, the genus has a cosmopolitan distribution.

Species
Hymenelia aigneri 
Hymenelia ceracea 
Hymenelia cyanocarpa 
Hymenelia epulotica 
Hymenelia glacialis 
Hymenelia grossa 
Hymenelia gyalectoidea 
Hymenelia heteromorpha 
Hymenelia macrospora 
Hymenelia melanocarpa 
Hymenelia microcarpa  – Falkland Islands
Hymenelia parva 
Hymenelia prevostii 
Hymenelia rhodopis

References

Lecanoromycetes
Lecanoromycetes genera
Lichen genera
Taxa described in 1852
Taxa named by August von Krempelhuber